Nature Reviews Cardiology is a monthly peer-reviewed scientific journal published by Nature Portfolio. It was established in 2004 as Nature Clinical Practice Cardiovascular Medicine, but change name in April 2009. The editor-in-chief is Gregory Lim.

Coverage includes:
 acute coronary syndromes
 arrhythmias
 angina/coronary artery disease
 cardiomyopathy/heart failure
 concomitant disease
 congenital conditions
 hypertension
 imaging
 infection 
 interventional cardiology
 pathology 
 stroke 
 surgery/transplantation 
 thrombosis
 valvular disease
 vascular disease
 general therapies
 disease markers
 genetics and public health.

According to the Journal Citation Reports, the journal has a 2021 impact factor of 49.421, ranking it 1st out of 143 journals in the category "Cardiac & Cardiovascular Systems".

References

External links
 Official website

Nature Research academic journals
Cardiology journals
Monthly journals
English-language journals
Publications established in 2004
Review journals